Bernot is a French surname. As of 2013, there are more than 1,100 people in France who have this surname.

Notable people
Notable people with this surname include:
 Alenka Bernot, Yugoslav canoer
 Dare Bernot, Yugoslav canoer
 Denise Bernot, French professor of Burmese
 Lorenza Bernot, Mexican beauty pageant contestant
 Louis Bernot, French weightlifter
 Natan Bernot, Yugoslav canoer

References